Raymond Sayer Ritchie (12 January 1889 – 15 April 1950) was an Australian rules footballer who played with Carlton in the Victorian Football League (VFL).

Family
The son of William Alexander Ritchie, and Anne Ritchie, née Price, Raymond Sayer Ritchie was born at Rutherglen, Victoria 12 January 1889.

He married Florence Kathleen Murphy (1888-) in 1911.

Football
Although initially cleared from Korumburra to play with Carlton, a protest was lodged by Richmond, and the VFL allowed the registration with Carlton, but Carlton was instructed not to play Ritchie until the matter was settled.

The matter was eventually resolved, and he played his first and only match for Carlton in the second last match of the season, against St Kilda on 28 August 1909, when he was used as one of the replacements for players that were being rested (i.e., Doug Gillespie, Martin Gotz, Alex Lang, and Billy Payne) in anticipation of the season's finals (it was considered to be an easy match for the Carlton team, which beat St Kilda 11.13(79) to 5.3 (33)).

Death
He died at Newport, Victoria on 15 April 1950.

Notes

References

External links 

Ray Ritchie's profile at Blueseum

1889 births
Australian rules footballers from Victoria (Australia)
Carlton Football Club players
1950 deaths